Lepeophtheirus pectoralis is a species of parasitic copepod from the northeast Atlantic Ocean, and the type species of the genus Lepeophtheirus. It is a parasite of flatfish, with the European flounder (Platichthys flesus), the plaice (Pleuronectes platessa), and the dab (Limanda limanda) as the most frequent hosts. It feeds on the mucus, skin, and blood of the fish, with egg-producing females infecting the pectoral and pelvic fins of the host, while immature individuals and males are found on the rest of the body.

Lifecycle

Its lifecycle consists of five phases and 10 stages. The first two stages are free-swimming nauplius I and II, while the third stage is the copepodid stage, during which the copepod attaches itself to the fish. Stages IV, V, VI and VII are the chalimus stages, and are followed by the preadult and adult stages, when differentiation of males and females is possible. Multiple generations are apparently produced per year, which show differences in longevity, size, and fecundity.

See also
 Fish diseases and parasites

References 

Siphonostomatoida
Parasitic crustaceans
Animal parasites of fish
Crustaceans described in 1776
Taxa named by Otto Friedrich Müller
Crustaceans of the Atlantic Ocean